In linguistics, clipping, also called truncation or shortening, is word formation by removing some segments of an existing word to create a synonym. Clipping differs from abbreviation, which is based on a shortening of the written, rather than the spoken, form of an existing word or phrase. Clipping is also different from back-formation, which proceeds by (pseudo-)morpheme rather than segment, and where the new word may differ in sense and word class from its source.

Creation
According to Hans Marchand, clippings are not coined as words belonging to the core lexicon of a language. They originate as jargon or slang of an in-group, such as schools, army, police, and the medical profession. Clipped forms can pass into common usage when they are widely useful, becoming part of standard English, which most speakers would agree has happened with math/maths, lab, exam, phone (from telephone), fridge (from refrigerator), and various others. When their usefulness is limited to narrower contexts, they remain outside the standard register. Many, such as mani and pedi for manicure and pedicure or mic/mike for microphone, occupy a middle ground in which their appropriate register is a subjective judgment, but succeeding decades tend to see them become more widely used.

Types
 Final clipping or apocope
 Initial clipping, apheresis, or procope
 Medial clipping or syncope
 Complex clipping, creating clipped compounds

Final and initial clipping may be combined and result in curtailed words with the middle part of the prototype retained, which usually includes the syllable with primary stress. Examples: fridge (refrigerator),  Polly (Apollinaris), rona (coronavirus), shrink (head-shrinker), tec (detective); also flu (which omits the stressed syllable of influenza), jams (retaining the binary noun -s of pajamas/pyjamas) or jammies (adding diminutive -ie).

Final

In a final clipping, the most common type in English, the beginning of the prototype is retained. The unclipped original may be either a simple or a composite. Examples include ad and advert (advertisement), cable (cablegram), doc (doctor), exam (examination), fax (facsimile), gas (gasoline), gym (gymnastics, gymnasium), memo (memorandum), mutt (muttonhead), pub (public house), pop (popular music), and clit (clitoris). An example of apocope in Israeli Hebrew is the word lehit, which derives from להתראות lehitraot, meaning "see you, goodbye".

Initial

Initial (or fore) clipping retains the final part of the word. Examples: bot (robot), chute (parachute), roach (cockroach), gator (alligator), phone (telephone), pike (turnpike), varsity (university), net (Internet).

Medial

Words with the middle part of the word left out are few. They may be further subdivided into two groups: (a) words with a final-clipped stem retaining the functional morpheme: maths (mathematics), specs (spectacles); (b) contractions due to a gradual process of elision under the influence of rhythm and context. Thus, fancy (fantasy), ma'am (madam), and fo'c'sle may be regarded as accelerated forms.

Complex

Clipped forms are also used in compounds. One part of the original compound most often remains intact. Examples are:  Sometimes both halves of a compound are clipped as in  In these cases it is difficult to know whether the resultant formation should be treated as a clipping or as a blend, for the border between the two types is not always clear. According to Bauer (1983), the easiest way to draw the distinction is to say that those forms which retain compound stress are clipped compounds, whereas those that take simple word stress are not. By this criterion bodbiz, Chicom, Comsymp, Intelsat, midcult, pro-am, photo op, sci-fi, and sitcom are all compounds made of clippings.

See also

Clipping (phonetics)
Compound (linguistics)
Contraction (grammar)
Diminutive
Portmanteau
Word formation

References

Word coinage